Asociación Bet-El is a Sephardi Orthodox synagogue in the city of Caracas that is affiliated to the Israelite Association of Venezuela. The synagogue was built between 1969 and 1973, with donations from Brazilian banker Edmond Safra, and is located in the Caracas neighborhood of San Bernardino. Currently, the community is made up mostly of Jews from Aleppo (Syria), Melilla (Spain) and northern Morocco, especially from the cities of Tetouan and Chefchaouen.

The synagogue is located on Avenida Cajigal. It can accommodate about 300 people in the men's section, which is adorned with stained glass windows designed by the Israeli artist Yaacov Agam; in addition to this, the wall that contains the Heichal is a sculpture made by the Venezuelan artist Harry Abend and can accommodate about 100 people in the women's section upstairs. The synagogue also has a lounge in the basement, which is used for celebrations and bar and bat mitzvahs, wedding receptions, meals and the sheva Brachot ritual, which was inaugurated in 1988. On the top floor of the building, next to the area of prayers used by women, is a study room or Bet Midrash. Available in the synagogue are Torah with Rashi, prayer books in Hebrew and phonetic translation and Spanish for those who do not completely dominate the Hebrew language.

Currently, the rabbi of the synagogue is Isaac Sananes.

References

Synagogues completed in 1973
Buildings and structures in Caracas
Moroccan diaspora
Sephardi Jewish culture in Venezuela
Sephardi synagogues
Spanish Venezuelan
Synagogues in Venezuela
Syrian diaspora in South America
Orthodox synagogues
Orthodox Judaism in South America